Thomas Fearn (November 15, 1789 – January 16, 1863) was an American politician who served as a Deputy from Alabama to the Provisional Congress of the Confederate States from February until April 1861, when he resigned from office.

Biography 
Thomas Fearn was born on November 15, 1789, in Pittsylvania County, Virginia, and later moved to Alabama. He served in the War of 1812 and as a member of the Alabama state legislature. Before the American Civil War, he was a practicing physician in Hunstville, Alabama, and served as a physician under Andrew Jackson. He was the father-in-law of William Taylor Sullivan Barry. In 1861, he was a Deputy to the Provisional Congress of the Confederate States, representing the state of Alabama.

References

External links 

 
 Thomas Fearn at The Political Graveyard

1789 births
1863 deaths
19th-century American politicians
Burials in Alabama
Deputies and delegates to the Provisional Congress of the Confederate States
Physicians from Alabama
Signers of the Confederate States Constitution
Signers of the Provisional Constitution of the Confederate States